Meikle may refer to:

People:
Adrian Meikle, Welsh curler
Andrea Meikle (née Crowther) (born 1963), former association football player who represented New Zealand at international level
Andrew Meikle (1719–1811), Scottish mechanical engineer credited with inventing the threshing machine
Andrew Meikle Bryan (1893–1988), Scottish mining engineer
Carola Ivena Meikle (née Dickinson), British algologist, or anaesthetist with speciality training in pain management
George Meikle Kemp (1795–1844), Scottish carpenter/joiner, draughtsman, and self-taught architect
Hugh Meikle (1940–2016), Welsh curler and coach
Izzy Meikle-Small (born 1996), British actress who has appeared in feature films and TV shows
Jamie Meikle, Welsh curler
Jeffrey L. Meikle, American cultural historian
John James Meikle (1845–1937), New Zealand farmer and litigant
John Meikle VC MM (1898–1918), Scottish World War I recipient of the Victoria Cross
John Meikle (Saskatchewan politician) (1870–1964), Scottish-born farmer and political figure in Saskatchewan
Lindon Meikle (born 1988), English professional footballer
Orde Meikle (born 1964), member of DJ duo Slam, with Stuart MacMillan (born 1966); co-founders of Soma Quality Recordings
Richard Meikle (1929–1991), Australian actor who worked in film, theatre, film and radio
Robert Desmond Meikle (1923–2021), Irish botanist from the Royal Botanic Gardens, Kew
Robert Greenshields Meikle (1830–1887), merchant and political figure in Quebec
Ryan Meikle (born 1996), English professional darts player
Sam Meikle (born 1971), Australian writer and director best known for his work in television
Thomas Meikle (1861–1939), Scottish-born businessman and pioneer in Rhodesia

Places:
Meikle Auchengree, hamlet near Kilbirnie and Longbar in North Ayrshire, Scotland
Meikle Bin, peak in the Kilsyth Hills in Scotland
Meikle Carewe Hill, landform in Aberdeenshire, Scotland in the Mounth Range of the Grampian Mountains
Meikle Earnock, medium-sized suburb in the south of Hamilton, Scotland
Meikle Loch, in Aberdeenshire, North East Scotland
Meikle Millyea, a mountain in South West Scotland
Meikle Pap, a mountain in North East Scotland
Meikle Says Law in the Lammermuir Hills (An Lomair Mòr in Gaelic) in southern Scotland
Meikle Wartle, small rural village in north-east of Scotland

See also
Meike (disambiguation)
Meikles
Meile (disambiguation)
Mikl (disambiguation)